Pervomayskoye is a rural locality (a selo) and the administrative center of Pervomaysky District, Tomsk Oblast, Russia. Population:

Climate

References

Notes

Sources

Rural localities in Tomsk Oblast